Poznań is a Polish parliamentary constituency in the Greater Poland Voivodeship, which elects ten Members of the Sejm.

The district has the number '39' for elections to the Sejm and is named after the city of Poznań.  It includes the city county of Poznań and the surrounding county of the same name.

List of members

Sejm

Footnotes

Electoral districts of Poland
Greater Poland Voivodeship
Poznań